Javier Cherro Molina (10 December 1980 in Alicante) is a Spanish former racing cyclist.

Palmares
2005
3rd Overall Tour of Britain
5th Overall Vuelta a la Comunidad Valenciana

References

1980 births
Living people
Spanish male cyclists
Sportspeople from Alicante
Cyclists from the Valencian Community